Karl Lehrmann (29 September 1887, Saaz - 12 October 1957, Mödling) was an Austrian architect and art Professor.

Life and work 
His father, Wenzl Lehrmann, was a shoemaker and his mother, Anna, worked in a local factory. After that, he was enrolled at the Academy of Fine Arts, Vienna, from 1908 to 1912, where he studied in the master class of Friedrich Ohmann. In his final year there, he was awarded the Academy's Gundel-Prize for excellence.

After working for the architectural firm of Fellner & Helmer, he opened his own office was routinely involved in competitions for projects, although most of his designs were never realized. In 1915, he volunteered for military service and served with the railway troops in Korneuburg.

In 1920, when the Town Council of Perchtoldsdorf decided to issue Notgeld (emergency money), he was commissioned to design notes and coins in a variety of values. He also enjoyed his greatest professional success during this time; designing buildings in Brno, Linz, Perchtoldsdorf and Mödling, as well as Vienna.

He was awarded a Silver Cross for his educational work in 1930, and transferred to the Staatsgewerbeschule, Vienna, in 1935. Shortly after World War II, in 1946, he retired and wrote some architectural textbooks.

References

Further reading 
 Petra Hlavácková, "Znovuobjeveny architekt Karl Lehrmann mezi Vidni a Brnem" (Between Vienna and Brno - the rediscovered architect Karl Lehrmann). In: Lukáš Fasora, Jiří Hanuš, Jiří Malíř: Brno Vídni, Vídeň Brnu: zemské metropole a centrum říše v 19. století (Brno – Vienna, Vienna – Brno. State metropolis and center of the empire in the 19th century), Brno 2008, pg.293 ff.

External links 

 Österreichisches Architektenlexikon
 BAM Brno - Brünner Architekturmanual - Architekt Karl Lehrmann
 Architektur in Nordböhmen - Karl Lehrmann

1887 births
1957 deaths
Austrian architects
Academy of Fine Arts Vienna alumni
People from Žatec